The 1903 Liverpool West Derby by-election was held on 20 January 1903 after the death of the incumbent Conservative MP Samuel Wasse Higginbottom.  It was retained by the Conservative candidate Watson Rutherford.

Vacancy
The by-election in West Derby was caused by the death in December 1902 of Conservative MP, Samuel Wasse Higginbottom. He had won the seat unopposed in the previous election in 1900.

Candidates
Several names were mentioned as possible candidates for the Conservative Party, among them the ship-owner Sir Alfred Lewis Jones, the former Lord Mayor of Liverpool Alderman Charles Petrie, and the incumbent Lord Mayor Watson Rutherford. Rutherford was a native of Liverpool, head of an important legal firm in the city, had been a member of the City Council since 1895, and Lord Mayor of Liverpool since November 1902. He was unanimously elected as the candidates by the local conservative council on 5 January, and accepted the nomination the following day, when he also resigned as Lord Mayor.

The Liberal Party chose the president of their local West Derby Division, Richard Durning Holt.

Issues

Result

References

1903 elections in the United Kingdom
1903 in England
West Derby, 1903
1900s in Liverpool